George of Cyprus (Latinized as Georgius Cyprius) was a Byzantine geographer of the early seventh century. 

Nothing is known of his life save that he was born at Lapithos in the island of Cyprus. He is known for his Descriptio orbis Romani ("Description of the Roman world"), written in the decade 600–610. It is written in Greek, and lists cities, towns, fortresses and administrative divisions of the Eastern Roman Empire. The list begins with Italy and moves counterclockwise along the Mediterranean, from Africa, Egypt and Oriens. The surviving list is evidently incomplete, as the Balkans are excluded. The Descriptio only survived in a compilation, probably from the 9th century, along with other lists such as ecclesiastical notitiae. It is possible that the compiler, usually thought to be the Armenian Basil of Ialimbana, altered George's text.

Publications 

 Georgii Cyprii Descriptio Orbis Romani (Lipsiae, 1890), editor Heinrich Gelzer

See also
 Synecdemus

Notes

References
 

7th-century Byzantine people
7th-century Cypriot people
Byzantine geographers
7th-century Byzantine writers
7th-century geographers